G. Devasahayam was the Indian President of the Protestant Andhra Evangelical Lutheran Church Society and served during the periods 1956–1960 and again from 1963–1964.  During his second stint as President of the AELC, Devasahayam participated in the opening of the newly formed Andhra Christian Theological College then located in the same campus of the Lutheran Theological College in Rajahmundry.

Studies
Gorikapudi Devasahayam completed his graduate studies at the Lutheran Theological College, Rajahmundry which at that time was directly affiliated to the Senate of Serampore College (University) and was assigned pastoral ministry.  Later, Devasahayam was appointed to teach at his alma mater, the Lutheran Theological College in Rajahmundry.

The AELC Society sent Devasahayam on study leave to the Lutheran Theological Seminary at Philadelphia during 1953–1954 where he studied during the period of the eminent human rights specialist, Frederick Nolde.  The seminary awarded a postgraduate degree in Master of Sacred Theology (S.T.M.) upon Devasahayam in the succeeding convocation in 1955.

Ecclesiastical ministry
Devasahayam began teaching at the Lutheran Theological College in Rajahmundry from 1944 onwards until his elevation to the Presidency of the Lutheran Society in 1956 and again in 1963 when Devasahayam proceeded to Guntur to take up the responsibilities of the Society.  After his second stint as President ended in 1964, Devasahayam returned to Rajahmundry and joined the faculty of the newly formed Andhra Christian Theological College, a Protestant Regional Theologiate that included the Anglicans, Baptists, Congregationalists, Lutherans,  Methodists and Wesleyans.

During the time as Professor in Rajahmundry, Devasahayam also served as a Pastor of St. Paul's Lutheran Church in Rajahmundry from 1947–1950.

Reminisce
Talathoti Punnaiah who studied a 3-year theology course leading to Bachelor of Theology at the Andhra Christian Theological College, both at Rajahmundry and at Hyderabad from 1970–1973 recalls his association with Devasahayam,

References

Further reading
 
 
 
 
 
 
 

Indian Lutherans
Indian Christian theologians
Translators of the Bible into Telugu
Telugu people
Christian clergy from Andhra Pradesh
20th-century Indian translators
Senate of Serampore College (University) alumni
Academic staff of the Senate of Serampore College (University)
Living people
Year of birth missing (living people)